"Knight Crawler" is a song by American rappers Trippie Redd and Juice Wrld. It was released on January 20, 2023, as a track from Trippie Redd's fourth studio album Mansion Musik (2023).

Critical reception
Andre Gee of Rolling Stone stated that Trippie Redd "matches the late Juice WRLD's conviction on" the song, "wailing 'Don't know where I'm from, don't know where I've been'".

Credits and personnel
 Trippie Redd – vocals, songwriting
 Juice Wrld – vocals, songwriting
 CB Mix – production, songwriting
 Igor Mamet – mastering, mixing, recording

Charts

References

External links
 

2023 songs
Trippie Redd songs
Juice Wrld songs
Songs written by Juice Wrld
Songs written by Trippie Redd
Rap metal songs
Screamo songs
Songs about drugs